Heathville is an unincorporated community in Jefferson County, in the U.S. state of Pennsylvania.

History
A post office called Heathville was in operation between 1841 and 1965. The community was named for a Judge Heath, who resided there.

References

Unincorporated communities in Jefferson County, Pennsylvania
Unincorporated communities in Pennsylvania